Wingfield railway station served a rural area of Derbyshire, England between 1840 and 1967.

History
It was built by the North Midland Railway (NMR) on its line between Derby and Leeds, close to the road between South Wingfield and Oakerthorpe. The station closed in 1967 and the buildings, by Francis Thompson, still stand but are in derelict condition. The line is still in use as part of the Midland Main Line. Thompson designed 13 stations on the NMR, of which Wingfield is the only one to survive as-built.

Current status
The empty station building and paved forecourt are Grade II* listed due to being one of the earliest surviving railway station buildings, and the only surviving example from the opening of the line. However, it has been listed on Historic England's Heritage at Risk Register for some years as being in a 'very bad' state. In May 2018, the station was compulsorily purchased by Amber Valley Borough Council, due to neglect by its owner. A March 2017 Repairs Notice, served by the council with the support of Historic England, had not been acted upon.

In November 2019, the Derbyshire Historic Buildings Trust (DHBT) announced that it would be taking over the ownership from the council, following the receipt of lottery funding. The trust is restoring the building with the aim of finding new uses and plans to hold living history events and open days.

In times past this area was important for coal mining, at Oakerthorpe, South Wingfield, with a branch to Shirland.

See also
Grade II* listed buildings in Amber Valley
Listed buildings in South Wingfield

References

External links 	
 

History of Derbyshire
Former Midland Railway stations
Railway stations in Great Britain opened in 1840
Railway stations in Great Britain closed in 1967
Disused railway stations in Derbyshire
Grade II* listed buildings in Derbyshire
Grade II* listed railway stations
Beeching closures in England
1840 establishments in England
Francis Thompson railway stations